Venita Coelho is an Indian writer, director and artist and currently lives in Goa. Coelho is credited with having made a mark for herself in children's literature, besides film and television.

Birth, education
Born in Dehra Dun, which today lies in Uttarakhand, Coelho grew up and was educated in Kolkatta (then Calcutta), where she attended St. Xavier's College. She later moved to Mumbai (Bombay), and did her diploma in social communications media at the Sophia College there.

Career: media and books
After working in film and television for over a decade as writer-director-producer, she re-located to Goa. She is now the author of ten published books, including Dead As A Dodo, which won The Sahitya Akademi Bal Puruskar for 2020 and The Hindu for Good Reads award for best fiction for children 2016.

In films and TV
Her career in television started as an intern at UTV in Mumbai. She has since written, produced and directed shows. She quit her decade long career in television when the saas-bahu genre  became dominant. Coelho has said, "I couldn’t bring myself to do that to other women. Put out as a role model a heroine who only suffers endlessly."

She returned to television to work on the show, Jassi Jaisi Koi Nahin (an adaptation of Betty La Fea)  which ran counter to the dominant narrative style of television to tell the story of an ugly underdog. For Indian television her writing credits include the series Na Bole Tum Na Maine Kuch Kaha, Amma and Family, Avishkar, Jungli Toofan Tyre Puncture, Trikaal and Head Over Heels. She has also written and directed telefilms -- Wild Rose, Picnic and The Lost Son.

She gets co-writing credits on the Story/Screenplay for Musafir and the Adaptation and Screenplay credits for We Are Family.

For Malaysian television she wrote Idaman. Her work for television in Singapore includes the telefilm, Angel, and the series Anything Goes, Rojak, Bold and Bollywood, Rehai among others. She has been Vice President, New Product Development at Sony Entertainment Television; Vice President, Fiction Content, Endemol India; Vice President, Fiction Content, Nimbus and Creative Head, Cinevistaas Ltd.

Coelho has written the daily soap Trikaal and Karan Johar's adaptation of Stepmom, We are Family. She also wrote the script for Jassi Jaisa Koi Nahin in 2003.

Books authored
 Dungeon Tales (Scholastic India) 
 Tiger by the Tail (Hachette India) -- Nominated for the Neev Literary Award 2018)
 Boy No. 32 (nominated for the Neev Literary Award 2018)
 Soap! Writing and Surviving Television in India (Harper Collins India)
 Dead as Dodo (winner of The Hindu/Good Reads Award for Best Fiction for Children 2016) Winner of The "Sahitya Akademi" "Bal Puruskar" 2020
 Monkey See Monkey Do (nominated for The Hindu/Good Reads Award for the Best Fiction for Children 2017. Nominated for the Neev Literary Award 2018)
 The Washer of the Dead: A Collection of Ghost Stories, called "a ghost folklore from a feminist perspective" (Zubaan/ Penguin India). Recommended by Erica Jong as one of the ten best books on death and dying, this collection of feminist ghost stories was long listed for the Frank O'Connor award.

In art
Coelho works in oils and acrylics on canvas and glass. She held her first solo exhibition titled ‘The Naked Gaze’ in Goa in 2010.

Columns and the media
She wrote a column for The Indian Express titled "The Tale of Two Cities" that covered the difference between lives in privileged South Mumbai and life beyond Bandra. Under the pseudonym "Hot Potato", she wrote a column for The Indian Express on the inner complications of working in the media. She wrote a series of short fictions in The Asian Age titled "Five Minute Fiction". Her column for The Herald (O Heraldo) in Goa was called "The Accidental Activist", and chronicled her challenges as part of the Goa Bachao Abhiyaan and the popular people's movement that protested a controversial Regional Plan for Goa.

References

External links
 Venita Coelho, the woman who ran away from Television
 An interview with Venita Coelho, "Boy No. 32" 
 Frankly Speaking with Venita Coelho - Mocomi Kids
 

Living people
20th-century Indian women writers
20th-century Indian writers
21st-century Indian women writers
21st-century Indian writers
1966 births